Abderrahim Benkajjane (born 1 June 1983) is a French professional footballer who currently plays as a defender for Moroccan Botola side Khénifra. He was born in Saint-Dié-des-Vosges, France, and started his career in the lower leagues with Raon-l'Étape where he played alongside his older brother Hassan. He transferred to Feignies in 2007 before moving to Morocco the following year to join KAC Marrakech. In the summer of 2009, Benkajjane was signed by Wydad Casablanca.

References

Abderrahim Benkajjane profile at mountakhab.net

1983 births
Living people
People from Saint-Dié-des-Vosges
French footballers
French sportspeople of Moroccan descent
Association football defenders
US Raon-l'Étape players
Wydad AC players
Kawkab Marrakech players
French expatriate footballers
Expatriate footballers in Kuwait
Expatriate footballers in Morocco
Entente Feignies Aulnoye FC players
Sportspeople from Vosges (department)
Footballers from Grand Est
Khaitan SC players
Kuwait Premier League players
French expatriate sportspeople in Kuwait
French expatriate sportspeople in Morocco